Shahrak-e Benat ol Hoda (also Romanized as Shahrak-e Benat ol Hodá; also known as Kūy-e Bent ol Hodá) is a village in Kushk Rural District, Abezhdan District, Andika County, Khuzestan Province, Iran. At the 2006 census, its population was 230, in 55 families.

References 

Populated places in Andika County